Holland Jachtbouw is a shipyard specialized in building large sailing yachts. It is located in the municipality of Zaandam in the Netherlands.

History
The shipyard was established by Chris Gongriep (1946-2016) in 1990 as De Hemmes to build lemsteraken, a traditional wooden workboat type from Lemmer. The yard acquired naval architect André Hoek's newbuild management company Dutch Built in 1998 in order to transition to aluminium sailing yachts; Thereafter Hoek cooperated closely with Gongriep, producing the largest two-mast schooner in history, Athos, in 2010. After completing a significant expansion of the shipyard's building shed, Gongriep committed suicide on December 9th, 2016, and the shipyard's brand new 12,000m² facilities were subsequently rented out to fellow Dutch yachtbuilder Royal Huisman.

List of yachts built

See also
List of sailboat designers and manufacturers
List of large sailing yachts

External links
 Holland Jachtbouw website

Dutch boat builders
Dutch brands
Yacht building companies
Sailing in the Netherlands
Economy of North Holland
Lists of yachts
Lists of sailing ships